Central American Spanish ( or ) is the general name of the Spanish language dialects spoken in Central America. More precisely, the term refers to the Spanish language as spoken in Costa Rica, El Salvador, Guatemala, Honduras, and Nicaragua. Panamanian Spanish is considered a variety of Caribbean Spanish, it is transitional between Central American & Caribbean dialects.

Variation
While most vocabulary is common, each country has its variations, for instance following are examples of how to colloquial say corner store and soft drink in the different countries:  In Guatemala, they are tienda or bodega in some parts of the country and agua, respectively, except for the Jutiapa department of Guatemala where a soft drink is known as a gaseosa (water is agua pura). In El Salvador, they are tienda and gaseosa but more commonly called soda now. In Honduras, they are pulpería (in the north called trucha informally) and fresco. In Nicaragua, they are venta or pulpería and gaseosa. In Costa Rica, they are pulpería and gaseosa although they could also be abastecedor and refresco or fresco, in Panama they are tienda and soda.

Phonetics and phonology
Some characteristics of Central American phonology include:
  at the end of a syllable or before a consonant is pronounced like  quite often in the three central nations of El Salvador, Honduras and Nicaragua. This is less frequent in formal speech, like TV broadcasts. In the casual speech of some Salvadoran and Honduran speakers, this may also occur syllable or even word-initially.
 Word final  is velarized, being pronounced as a velar nasal .
 Both central Guatemala and central Costa Rica have a tendency to assibilate .
 Use of seseo.

Most phonological features of Central American Spanish are similar to Andalusian, Canarian, and Caribbean, and most other coastal Latin American Spanish dialects.

Voseo

However,  is the dominant second person singular pronoun.  is used in Spanish-speaking Central America, with the exception of Panama, among family members, close friends, and in informal contexts. When addressing strangers,  is used. The imperative is formed by dropping the final -R of the infinitive, and then adding an acute accent to the final vowel to retain the stress.

The use of  enjoys low prestige and is often considered incorrect. Educated Costa Ricans are also more comfortable using , and negative attitudes towards  have been changing as of late.

The only irregular conjugation in the imperative is the verb ir and ser.

The conjugation of the present tense follows the pattern of replacing the final -R of the infinitive with an -S and adding an acute accent to the previous vowel.

Note how the conjugation of vos presents fewer irregularities compared to tú.

The main difference of the voseo in Argentina is the conjugation of the subjunctive. Rioplatense Spanish prefers the subjunctive forms of tú, whereas in Central America, the vos forms are retained.

The pronoun usted is used when addressing older, unfamiliar or respected persons, as it is in most Spanish-speaking countries; however, in Costa Rica, Guatemala, and Honduras it is frequently used with younger people, and in Honduras between husband and wife, and friends. In Nicaragua, the pronoun is only used among youth during special or formal occasions or when addressing unfamiliar individuals in a formal manner.  It's also used with most, if not all, profanities familiar to the region.

Pronouns and verb conjugation

As previously mentioned, one of the features of the Central American speaking style is the voseo: the usage of the pronoun vos for the second person singular, instead of tú. In some Spanish-speaking regions where voseo is used, it is sometimes considered a non-standard lower-class or regional variant, whereas in other regions voseo is standard. Vos is used with forms of the verb that resemble those of the second person plural (vosotros) in Spanish from Spain.

Some people prefer to say "tú" instead of "vos" while conjugating the verbs using the vos forms; for instance: tú cantás, tú bailás, tú podés, etc. This is avoided in Southern Central America, especially in Costa Rica and Nicaragua where is associated with bad education by mixing 2 different pronouns (tú-vos).

The second person plural pronoun, which is vosotros in Spain, is replaced with ustedes in C. American Spanish, like most other Latin American dialects. While usted is the formal second person singular pronoun, its plural ustedes has a neutral connotation and can be used to address friends and acquaintances as well as in more formal occasions (see T-V distinction). Ustedes takes a grammatically third person plural verb. Usted is particularly used in Costa Rica between strangers, with foreign people and used by the vast majority of the population in Alajuela and rural areas of the country.

As an example, see the conjugation table for the verb amar in the present tense, indicative mode:

(²) Ustedes is used throughout all of Latin America for both the familiar and formal. In Spain, it is used only in formal speech for the second person plural.

Although apparently there is just a stress shift (from amas to amás), the origin of such a stress is the loss of the diphthong of the ancient vos inflection from vos amáis to vos amás. This can be better seen with the verb "to be": from vos sois to vos sos. In vowel-alternating verbs like perder and morir, the stress shift also triggers a change of the vowel in the root:

For the -ir verbs, the Peninsular vosotros forms end in -ís, so there is no diphthong to simplify, and Central American vos employs the same form: instead of tú vives, vos vivís; instead of tú vienes, vos venís (note the alternation).

The imperative forms for vos are identical to the plural imperative forms in Peninsular minus the final -d (stress remains the same):

Hablá más alto, por favor. "Speak louder, please." (hablad in Peninsular)
Comé un poco de torta. "Eat some cake." (comed in Peninsular)
Vení para acá. "Come over here." (venid in Peninsular)

The plural imperative uses the ustedes form (i. e. the third person plural subjunctive, as corresponding to ellos).

As for the subjunctive forms of vos verbs, most speakers use the classical vos conjugation, employing the vosotros form minus the i in the final diphthong. However, some prefer to use the tú subjunctive forms like in Argentina or Paraguay.

Espero que veas or Espero que veás "I hope you can see" (Peninsular veáis)
Lo que quieras or (less used) Lo que querás "Whatever you want" (Peninsular queráis)

In the preterite, an s is often added, for instance (vos) perdistes. This corresponds to the classical vos conjugation found in literature. Compare Iberian Spanish form vosotros perdisteis. However, it is often deemed incorrect.

Other verb forms coincide with tú after the i is omitted (the vos forms are the same as tú).

Si salieras "If you went out" (Peninsular salierais)

Usage
In the old times, vos was used as a respectful term. In Central American Spanish, as in most other dialects which employ voseo, this pronoun has become informal, displacing tú. It is used especially for addressing friends and family members (regardless of age), but may also include most acquaintances, such as coworkers, friends of one's friends, people of similar age, etc.

Usage of tenses
Although literary works use the full spectrum of verb inflections, in Central American Spanish (as well as many other Spanish dialects), the future tense has been replaced by a verbal phrase (periphrasis) in the spoken language.

This verb phrase is formed by the verb ir ("go") followed by the preposition a and the main verb in the infinitive. This is akin to the English phrase going to + infinitive verb. For example:

Creo que descansaré un poco → Creo que voy a descansar un poco
Mañana me visitará mi madre → Mañana me va a visitar mi madre
Iré a visitarla mañana → Voy a ir a visitarla mañana

The present perfect (Spanish: Pretérito perfecto compuesto), just like pretérito anterior, is rarely used, so it's replaced by simple past.

Juan no ha llegado → Juan no llegó todavía
El torneo ha comenzado → El torneo comenzó

Lexicon
There are also many words unique to Central America, for example, chunche or chochadas means thing or stuff in some places. Also the words used to describe children (or kids) is different in various countries, for example in Nicaragua they are called chavalos (similar to chavales in Spain); or sipotes; while in Guatemala they are called patojos but in the eastern departments of Guatemala specifically the department of Jutiapa cipotes is also used to refer to children. In Honduras they're called güirros, chigüin, and cipotes is used in both Honduras and El Salvador, while in Costa Rica they are called güilas or carajillos. In Guatemala, Honduras, and El Salvador money is called pisto, a term coming from the Spanish dish 'pisto'. However, a common slang word used for money in all of the Central American countries (except Belize) is "plata". In addition, chucho in Guatemala, El Salvador, and Honduras means dog.

See also

Spanish dialects and varieties
Guatemalan Spanish
Salvadoran Spanish
Honduran Spanish
Nicaraguan Spanish
Costa Rican Spanish
Caliche

References

External links
REAL  ACADEMIA  ESPAÑOLA DICCIONARIO PANHISPÁNICO DE DUDAS
History of Voseo  
Lexicon of Nicaraguan Spanish
Dropping of S in word endings in Nicaragua
 voseo in El Salvador